The 2012–13 Penn State Nittany Lions basketball team represents Pennsylvania State University. Head coach Pat Chambers is in his second season with the team. The team played its home games in University Park, Pennsylvania, US at the Bryce Jordan Center.

Personnel

Coaching Staff

Roster

Schedule and results

|-
!colspan=9| Exhibition

|-
!colspan=9| Regular season

|-
!colspan=9| Big Ten tournament

References

Penn State
Penn State Nittany Lions basketball seasons